World Without End may refer to:

 "Unto the ages of ages", a biblical phrase sometimes translated as "world without end" in English books of prayer
World Without End (film), a 1956 science fiction B movie
World Without End, a 1953 documentary directed by Basil Wright and Paul Rotha
World Without End (Haldeman novel), a 1979 Star Trek novel by Joe Haldeman
World Without End (Follett novel), a 2007 novel by Ken Follett, sequel to The Pillars of the Earth
World Without End (miniseries), a 2012 television adaptation of the Follett novel, sequel to the earlier TV miniseries The Pillars of the Earth
World Without End (comics), a 1990 limited series from DC Comics written by Jamie Delano
World Without End (album), a 1988 album by the Mighty Lemon Drops
World Without End, a 1994 album by De/Vision
"World Without End", a song by Five Iron Frenzy from the 2000 album All the Hype That Money Can Buy
"Worlds Without End", a two-part episode of the 1985 television series G.I. Joe: A Real American Hero.